Berkel en Rodenrijs is a town and former municipality in the municipality of Lansingerland, in the province of South Holland, The Netherlands. The town is very close to ROTTERDAM

History 
Berkel en Rodenrijs was founded in the twelfth century. Its character changed across the centuries. Prior to its development, the land consisted of peat soil, which was cultivated for the production of turf.
This cultivation resulted in the appearance of moors. During the 18th century the moors were drained and agricultural use of polder land commenced. The years that followed resulted in significant changes to the town due to residential and commercial building developments.  (source: Gemeente Lansingerland)

In 1850 the town had a population count of 1,250, which by 1950 had expanded to 5,700.

The municipality of Tempel was abolished in 1855 and added to Berkel en Rodenrijs.

On 1 January 2007, the town was merged with neighbouring towns Bergschenhoek and Bleiswijk to form the new municipality of Lansingerland.

Public transport
 RandstadRail Line E
 RET has provided bus services since 9 December 2012: bus numbers 170, 173 and 174. 
Bus 170 runs along a new dedicated bus route through Lansingerland, known as the ZoRo bus ( Zoetermeer - Rotterdam ). This route goes from Zoetermeer Central Station to Rodenrijs Station.

Notable people

Born in Berkel en Rodenrijs
Phil Bloom (born 27 November 1945), Artist
Eimert van Middelkoop (born 14 February 1949), politician (ChristianUnion, minister of Defence 2009)
 Peter Olsthoorn (born 23 January 1960), IT and multimedia freelance journalist
Piet Rietveld (1952–2013) professor of transport economics at Vrije Universiteit Amsterdam
 Victor Scheffers (born 22 May 1960), Olympic rower for the Netherlands, 1980 Summer Games. 
Tim Vincken (born 12 September 1986), pro football player Feyenoord Rotterdam
Peter-Paul Pigmans (31 January 1961 – 27 August 2003), Dutch gabber music producer, best known for his production under the pseudonym 3 Steps Ahead.

Lived in Berkel en Rodenrijs
 Rob Madna (born 8 June 1931 in Den Haag, died 5 April 2003 in Berkel en Rodenrijs), pianist, trumpeter and composer.
 Annie M.G. Schmidt (*20 May 1911 – 21 May 1995) Dutch poet and well-known author of children's books lived in Berkel en Rodenrijs for some time during the mid 1960s.
 Wibi Soerjadi (born 2 March 1970) pianist and composer, has a younger brother Ardjoena Soerjadi who is also a musician. Both were infant prodigies.
 Ria Visser (born 20 July 1961), All-round speed skater, National Speed Skating Champion (1980, 1983, 1984, 1985,1986), Silver medal 1500m. 1980 Lake Placid Winter Olympics.
 Kiki Bertens (born 10 December 1991) WTA professional tennis player, reached number 4 in the world 5/2019.

Gallery

References

External links 

Municipalities of the Netherlands disestablished in 2007
Populated places in South Holland
Former municipalities of South Holland
Lansingerland